

The Chatelain AC.9 is a 1960s French two-seat homebuilt aircraft designed by Armand Chatelain.

Specifications

References

1960s French civil utility aircraft
Homebuilt aircraft
Single-engined tractor aircraft
Aircraft first flown in 1966